Kür (also, Kyur) is a village and municipality in the Shamkir Rayon of Azerbaijan.  It has a population of 6,833.

References 

Populated places in Shamkir District